Medrysone (INN, USAN) (brand names HMS, Medrocort, others; former developmental code name NSC-63278), also known as hydroxymethylprogesterone, methylhydroxyprogesterone, or hydroxymesterone, as well as 6α-methyl-11β-hydroxyprogesterone or 6α-methyl-11β-hydroxypregn-4-ene-3,20-dione, is a synthetic glucocorticoid that is or has been used in the treatment of inflammatory eye diseases. It has been discontinued in the United States. Although it is very similar in structure to progesterone, neither progestogenic nor androgenic activity has been demonstrated for or attributed to medrysone.

Environmental presence
In 2021, medrysone was one of the 12 compounds identified in sludge samples taken from 12 wastewater treatment plants in California that were associated with estrogenic activity in in vitro.

See also
 9α-Bromo-11-ketoprogesterone
 11β-Hydroxyprogesterone
 Endrisone
 Flugestone
 Fluorometholone

References

Secondary alcohols
Diketones
Glucocorticoids
Pregnanes